DHHS may refer to:
 United States Department of Health and Human Services (also known as HHS)
 Dixie Hollins High School, a high school in Pinellas County, Florida, U.S.
 Druid Hills High School, a high school in DeKalb County, Georgia, U.S.

See also
 Department of Health and Human Services (disambiguation)